Rhythmic  may refer to:

 Related to rhythm
 Rhythmic contemporary, a radio format
 Rhythmic adult contemporary, a radio format
 Rhythmic gymnastics, a form of gymnastics
 Rhythmic (chart), Billboard music chart

See also